An Avonlea Christmas (also known as Happy Christmas, Miss King) is a 1998 Canadian made-for-television Christmas film directed by Stefan Scaini and written by Raymond Storey.  A reunion special and sequel to the 1990–1996 television series Road to Avonlea, the story takes place against the backdrop of World War I as the King family prepares for Christmas Eve.

Cast

 Jackie Burroughs as Hetty King
 Cedric Smith as Alec King
 Mag Ruffman as Olivia Dale
 Lally Cadeau as Janet King
 Patricia Hamilton as Rachel Lynde
 Gema Zamprogna as Felicity Pike
 Zachary Bennett as Felix King
 Kay Tremblay as Great Aunt Eliza
 Molly Atkinson as Cecilly King
 Ryan Cooley as Daniel King
 Lauren Collins as Libby Hubble
 Asa Perlman as Monty Dale

See also
 List of Christmas films
Road to Avonlea

References

External links
 

1998 films
1990s English-language films
CBC Television original films
Television series reunion films
1990s Christmas films
English-language Canadian films
Canadian Christmas films
Films set in Prince Edward Island
Canadian drama television films
1990s Canadian films